Heliodorus was a metrist in the 1st century AD who worked upon the comedies of Aristophanes. He was the principal authority used by Juba of Mauretania.

Ancient Greek grammarians
1st-century writers